Tusculum is a ruined Roman city in the Latium region of Italy.

Tusculum may also refer to:

Places
Tusculum, Potts Point, a heritage-listed house in Potts Point, Sydney, Australia

United States
Tusculum (Princeton, New Jersey), a 1773 country estate, listed on the National Register of Historic Places
Tusculum (Arcola, North Carolina), an 1835 plantation house, listed on the National Register of Historic Places
Tusculum (Amherst, Virginia), a c. 1805 house, listed on the National Register of Historic Places
Tusculum, Tennessee, a city
Tusculum College, a university in Tennessee
Tusculum, Nashville, Tennessee, a neighborhood

Other uses
Counts of Tusculum, secular noblemen in Latium during the tenth through twelfth centuries
Battle of Tusculum, an 1167 battle between the Holy Roman Empire and the Commune of Rome

See also
Columbia-Tusculum, Cincinnati, Ohio, a neighborhood